Nove is an urban settlement (posyolok) in Kramatorsk Raion (district) in Donetsk Oblast of eastern Ukraine, at about  north by east (NbE) of the center of the city of Donetsk.

The village came under attack by Russian forces in 2022, during the Russian invasion of Ukraine, and was regained by Ukrainian forces in the end of September the same year.

References

Populated places in Donetsk Oblast